Koodi Vazhnthal Kodi Nanmai is a 2000 Indian Tamil-language comedy drama film directed by V. Sekhar. The film stars Nassar, Karan, Khushbu, Roja, Vadivelu, Vivek and Kovai Sarala (in her 100th Tamil film). It was released on 15 July 2000. The film was remade in Kannada as Jenu Goodu.

Plot 
Thangaraj is an innocent man from a middle-class family and his family consists of his wife Meenakshi, and daughter Padma. Boxer Krishnan, an irresponsible person with dreams of making big in politics is Thangaraj's younger brother and is married to Kanagavalli. Sivaraman is Thangaraj's youngest brother and is educated well and works in the same company where Thangaraj works which is owned by Valluvardasan.

They all live in a single house as a joint family. Thangaraj and Meenakshi were responsible for bringing up Sivaraman and they consider him as their own son. The family's financial status improves as Sivaraman earns well. Valluvardasan is impressed seeing Sivaraman's character and decides to get his daughter Tamilselvi married to him despite they belong to lower societal status. He also likes Thangaraj's joint family.

Initially, Kanagavalli remains sceptical about Tamilselvi as she is from a rich family and believes that she will not mingle with other family members. But Tamilselvi respects everyone in the family. Meanwhile, Sivaraman's behaviour changes as he thinks that he is the major breadwinner for the family and he wants other family members to obey him. This brings up frequent quarrels between Krishnan and Sivaraman as Sivaraman does not like Krishnan being idle at home with political aspirations.

Dhandapani is a neighbour of Thangaraj and he falls in love with Padma. Learning of the love affair, Thangaraj decides to get them married. But Dhandapani's father Veerapandi demands huge dowry. Thangaraj and Krishnan accept for the dowry with the hope that Sivaraman will provide the money. Sivaraman gets furious knowing this and he does not agree to give money and these result in a clash between the family members. Meenakshi feels bad as Sivaraman's priority has changed to money and she decides to leave the house with her daughter. Thangaraj also leaves the home along with her.

Tamilselvi learns that it was Thangaraj and Meenakshi who tried hard to educate Sivaraman and understands that it is his turn to help them in return. Tamilselvi worries that joint family has parted ways now and she tries to unite them. She meets Meenakshi and apologises for her husband's behaviour and she offers the money needed for the wedding of Padma. But Thangaraj does not accept this and instead, he gets furious seeing Tamilselvi as he believes that Sivaraman has changed a lot after earning money.

Sivaraman picks up a quarrel with his wife Tamilselvi after knowing that she has met Meenakshi and Kanagavalli. Also, Thangaraj does not like Meenakshi making friendship with Tamiliselvi and he is not interested to get his daughter Padma married to Dhandapani as he does not want to depend on Tamilselvi's help. But Meenakshi, Kanagavalli and Tamilselvi join and conduct the marriage between Padma and Dhandapani. Finally, Thangaraj's co-workers join with him and protest against Sivaraman where he gets beaten up. Sivaraman realises his mistake and apologises to his family members. In the end, everyone again moves as a joint family.

Cast 

Nassar as Thangarasu
Karan as Sivaraman
Khushbu as Meenakshi
Roja as Tamilselvi
Vadivelu as 'Boxer' Krishnan
Vivek as Dhandapani
Kovai Sarala as Kanagavalli
Thyagu as Veerapandi
Vijayakumar as Valluvardasan

Soundtrack 
The music was composed by Deva, with lyrics written by Muthulingam, Kalidasan, Kamakodiyan and Pazhani Bharathi.

Reception 
S. R. Ashok Kumar of The Hindu gave the film a mixed review: "The film begins brightly but falls flat in the second half". Ayyappa Prasad from Screen noted there were "good performances" though "technically, the film has nothing much to offer". Malini Mannath wrote for Chennai Online, "Director Shekhar, who is well versed with the middle class psyche, handles the scenes with expertise. The scenes are built up very naturally, the build-up to the fight very spontaneous. But after the break-up, the director [looses] focus. The screenplay takes a nose dive from which it never recovers".

References

External links 
 

2000 comedy-drama films
2000 films
2000s Tamil-language films
Films directed by V. Sekhar
Films scored by Deva (composer)
Indian comedy-drama films
Tamil films remade in other languages